Rydelek Icefalls is an area of icefalls between Smythe Shoulder and Coyer Point on the east side of Martin Peninsula, Walgreen Coast, in Marie Byrd Land. Mapped by United States Geological Survey (USGS) from surveys and U.S. Navy aerial photographs, 1959–67, and Landsat imagery, 1972–73. Named by Advisory Committee on Antarctic Names (US-ACAN) in 1977 after Paul Rydelek, geophysicist, University of California, Los Angeles, a member of the United States Antarctic Research Program (USARP) winter party at South Pole Station, 1974.
 

Icefalls of Antarctica
Bodies of ice of Marie Byrd Land